Senkevychivka is an urban-type settlement in Lutsk Raion of Volyn Oblast in Ukraine. Population:

Economy

Transportation
Senkevychivka railway station is on the railway connecting Lutsk and Lviv. There is infrequent passenger traffic.

The settlement has access to Highway H17 connecting Lutsk and Lviv.

References

Urban-type settlements in Lutsk Raion